Following are lists of the faculty of Royal College Colombo, the Colombo Academy and the Queens College Colombo as it was formally known. This includes its former Head Masters, principals and academic staff.

In the early twentieth century, appointments of the Principal of Royal College was made by the Secretary of State for the Colonies, later with the ratification of the State Council of Ceylon. At present, the appointment is made by the Minister of Education, under the recommendation of the Department of Education. The post is considered to be the most senior Principal in Sri Lanka Education Administrative Service.

Head Masters

Principals

Academic staff

Sir Senerat Gunewardene
Justice Anthony Gates 
Andrew Nicholl, RHA
Ashley Walker
Regi Siriwardena
Don Carlin Gunawardena 
Paikiasothy Saravanamuttu
R. I. T. Alles
Lionel Ranwala
Major L. V. Gooneratne, ED
Bvt. Lt. Colonel M.K.J. Cantlay, ED, JP
Raja Alwis
Moses Tirugnanasingam Thambapillai
E C Gunasekera

References

External links
Teachers of Royal College

Sri Lankan educators